Jennifer Marie Valente (born December 24, 1994) is an American professional racing cyclist who is the gold medal winner of the women's omnium at the 2020 Summer Olympics. Valente has ridden for UCI Women's Team . She has won multiple gold medals in team pursuit championships and earned an Olympic silver medal in the team pursuit in 2016.

Career
She enjoyed a successful junior career, winning 12 national titles and one world junior title. At the 2011 and 2012 UCI Junior Track World Championships she won three medals, a gold medal in the scratch race and two bronze medals in the keirin.

In the individual pursuit she won a silver medal at the 2015 UCI Track Cycling World Championships. In the team pursuit she has won three gold medals at the UCI Track Cycling World Championships and a silver medal at the 2016 Olympic Games.

In June 2021, she qualified  to represent the United States at the 2020 Summer Olympics. She took the gold medal in the women's omnium, beating reigning World champion Yumi Kajihara of Japan. This was the first women's track cycling gold medal for the United States.

Major results

2011
UCI Junior Track World Championships
1st  Scratch
3rd  Keirin
2012
1st  Keirin, National Track Championships
 3rd  Keirin, UCI Junior Track World Championships
Pan American Track Championships
3rd  Keirin
3rd  Scratch
2013
2nd Team pursuit, Los Angeles Grand Prix (with Kimberly Geist, Sarah Hammer and Ruth Winder)
2014
Pan American Track Championships
1st  Team pursuit (with Amber Gaffney, Kimberly Geist and Elizabeth Newell)
3rd  Omnium
1st  Omnium, National Track Championships
1st Omnium, Grand Prix of Colorado Spring
2015
 2nd  Individual pursuit, UCI Track World Championships
Pan American Track Championships
1st  Individual pursuit
1st  Scratch
1st  Team pursuit (with Kelly Catlin, Sarah Hammer and Ruth Winder)
 National Track Championships
1st  Individual pursuit
1st  Omnium
1st  Scratch
2nd  Team pursuit, Pan American Games (with Kelly Catlin, Sarah Hammer, Lauren Tamayo and Ruth Winder)
Independence Day Grand Prix
2nd Scratch
3rd Individual pursuit
2016
 1st  Team pursuit, UCI Track World Championships
 2nd  Team pursuit, Olympic Games
2017
 1st  Team pursuit, UCI Track World Championships
 Pan American Track Championships
1st  Omnium
1st  Points race
1st  Scratch
 National Track Championships
1st  Omnium
1st  Points race
1st  Scratch
1st Omnium, US Sprint GP
1st Omnium, Fastest Man on Wheels
 2017–18 UCI Track Cycling World Cup
1st  Omnium, Manchester
2nd  Omnium, Pruszków
 5th Overall Cascade Cycling Classic
2018
 UCI Track World Championships
1st  Team pursuit
2nd  Points race
 Pan American Track Championships
1st  Omnium
1st  Points race
1st  Scratch
1st  Team pursuit
 National Track Championships
1st  Madison
1st  Omnium
1st  Points race
1st  Scratch
 10th Winston-Salem Cycling Classic
2019
 3rd  Omnium, UCI Track World Championships
 National Track Championships
1st  Madison
1st  Omnium
1st  Points race
1st  Scratch
1st Omnium, 2019 Pan American Games
Pan American Track Cycling Championships
1st  Omnium
1st  Points race
1st  Scratch
1st  Madison
2019–20 UCI Track Cycling World Cup
1st Omnium, Belarus
1st Team Pursuit, Belarus
1st Points Race, Belarus
3rd Scratch, Belarus
1st Omnium, Brisbane
2020
2020 UCI Track Cycling World Championships
1st  Team pursuit
2nd  Points race
2nd  Scratch
2019–20 UCI Track Cycling World Cup
1st Omnium, Milton (Ontario)
1st Team Pursuit, Milton (Ontario)
3rd Madison, Milton (Ontario)
2021
2020 Summer Olympics
1st  Omnium
3rd  Team pursuit
2021 UCI Track Cycling World Championships
3rd  Scratch
3rd  Elimination
2022
2022 UCI Track Cycling World Championships
1st  Omnium
3rd  Elimination
3rd  Points race
2022 UCI Track Champions League
1st  2022 UCI Track Champions League – Women's Overall

References

External links

1994 births
Living people
American female cyclists
Sportspeople from San Diego
Cyclists at the 2015 Pan American Games
Cyclists at the 2016 Summer Olympics
Cyclists at the 2020 Summer Olympics
Olympic gold medalists for the United States in cycling
Olympic silver medalists for the United States in cycling
Olympic bronze medalists for the United States in cycling
Medalists at the 2016 Summer Olympics
Medalists at the 2020 Summer Olympics
Pan American Games medalists in cycling
Pan American Games silver medalists for the United States
UCI Track Cycling World Champions (women)
American track cyclists
Cyclists at the 2019 Pan American Games
Pan American Games gold medalists for the United States
Medalists at the 2015 Pan American Games
Medalists at the 2019 Pan American Games
21st-century American women
Cyclists from California